The discography of American hip hop group Goodie Mob consists of six studio albums, one compilation and nine singles.

Albums

Studio albums

Compilations

Singles

A Did not chart on the Hot 100 or Hot R&B/Hip-Hop charts (Billboard rules at the time prevented album cuts from charting). Chart peak listed here represents Hot 100 Airplay and Hot R&B/Hip-Hop Airplay charts data.

References

Hip hop discographies
Discographies of American artists